= Shia Islam in Australia =

Small religious minority in Australia

Notable migration of Shia Muslims to Australia began from the early 1970s onwards from countries like Lebanon, Pakistan, and later also from Iran, Iraq, and Afghanistan. Insecurity, foreign invasions/occupations, and/or the pursuit of better work opportunities have been primary motivations for Shia migration to Australia. Shia Muslims form a significant portion of the Muslim community in Australia. There are at least 80 Shia Islamic centres, mosques and community organisations. Estimated numbers extrapolated from the 2021 census data on ancestry indicate the Shia population in Australia in 2025 to be approximately 230,000.

== Shia Muslim Population in Australia ==
While official census data has not as yet distinguished between Sunni and Shia Muslim populations in Australia, by drawing on ancestry data from the ABS 2021 Census and applying country-of-origin Shia population proportions with adjustment factors based on migration patterns, and factoring in population growth since 2021, it is estimated that the Shia population in Australia in 2025 to be approximately 230,000.

AUSTRALIA - TOTAL
Nominated Ancestry	Total number of people in Australia who nominated this Ancestry	% of Shia in Country or Ethnicity of Ancestry	Adjustment Factor based on migration patterns from Country or Ethnicity of Ancestry	Estimate Total Of Shia from this Ancestry in Australia
Lebanon	248434	30	0.9*	67007
Hazara	41766	100	1.0	41766
Iraq	58000	67	1.0	38860
Iran	81119	92.5	0.2**	15007
Punjabi	118638	12	1.0	14237
India	783953	1.8	1	14111
Pakistan	97593	12	1.0	11711
Afghanistan (excluding Hazara)	54534	15	1.2***	9816
Arab (not further specified	60095	10	1.0	6009
Syria	29257	3	1	878
Kuwait	815	30	1	244
Saudi Arabia	1638	12.5	1	205
Yemen	1443	37	0.25****	133
Bahrain	166	70	1.0	116
Myanmar	36258	0.3	1*****	109
Estimated Total based on 2021 Data				220209
Estimated total in 2025 adjusted for total Australian population growth since 2021			Multiply by a factor of 1.07	235623

- Lebanese migration to Australia definitely includes a significant portion of Shia Muslims. The adjustment factor of 0.9 reflects the possibility that Shia migration was slightly lower in proportion compared to Sunni and Christian migration.
- The factor of 0.4 reflects the possibility that many Iranians who migrated to Australia may no longer identify as Shia Muslims.
- The factor of 1.2 reflects the likelihood that the Shia migration from Afghanistan- even when Hazara are excluded- is higher in proportion compared to Sunni migration, due to the persecution Shia faced and continue to face from extremist groups.
- This low factor reflects the likelihood that there has been little migration from the Shia population of Yemen to Australia.
- Despite the very small proportion of Shia in Myanmar, this ancestry is included because there is a small but well-known and visible Shia Myanmari community in Australia, especially in Sydney.

== Demography ==
=== Lebanon ===
While Lebanese migration to Australia could be traced back as early as the second half of the 19th century, the main and largest wave (1976–1990) of Lebanese—including Shia Lebanese—migration was triggered by the Lebanese Civil War. During this period of immense instability and conflict, Shias faced intense persecution, particularly in southern Lebanon, where they were targeted by militias and Israeli incursions, and became directly affected by the large-scale Israeli invasions of Lebanon in 1978 and 1982. Australia's Lebanon Concession relaxed migration criteria, enabling the influx of more than 20,000 civil war refugees, over half of which were Muslim. This included many Shias from deprived rural areas, who primarily settled in Sydney, where 75% of the Lebanese-born population was concentrated.

Lebanese Shia migration to Australia continued albeit at a slower pace post-1990 in a country reeling from the civil war, Israeli occupation, and associated socio-political challenges. These migration trends were driven by the need to escape violence, economic collapse, and sectarian marginalization, with Australia offering safety and family reunification opportunities. In the 2021 census, over 248,000 Australians reported Lebanese ancestry. Of those born in Lebanon, Muslims composed the highest population of 39,408, or 45.1% of all people born in Lebanon. These figures, combined with the insecurity and persecution faced by Lebanese Shia in recent decades, support the view that Shia Muslims make up a considerable portion of the quarter million people with Lebanese ancestry in Australia today.

=== Pakistan ===
Substantial Pakistani migration to Australia began in the 1970s after the White Australia Policy ended. Many were educated, middle-class Pakistanis arriving through skilled and family migration programs. By 2019, the Pakistani-born population reached 91,000, with a notable portion, estimated at 15% (or about 30 million people), being Shia Muslims, reflecting Pakistan's religious demographics. They often settle in urban areas like Sydney and Melbourne, contributing to professional sectors.

=== Iraq ===
Alongside various Iraqi Christians (of various groupings), there is a large demographic of Shia Muslims in Australia. Iraqi migration to Australia has occurred in distinct waves, primarily driven by conflict and persecution in Iraq. This migration has included a considerable portion of Shia Muslims due to their historical marginalization. The first notable wave followed the 1991 Gulf War and the brutal suppression of Shia and Kurdish uprisings against Saddam Hussein's regime, prompting many Shia Muslims, persecuted for their religious and political affiliations, to seek refuge in Australia. A second major migration wave occurred after the 2003 US-led invasion of Iraq, which severely disrupted the country's stability and security, and eventually gave rise to ISIS in 2013, intensifying sectarian violence and the targeted persecution of Shia communities.

The 2011 Australian census reported that 32% of Iraq-born Australians identified as 'Muslim' and it is believed that a significant portion of these were Shia due to the aforementioned ethno-religious persecution in Iraq that shaped migration flows. According to the same census, 80% of Iraqi-born migrants to Australia arrived between 1991 and 2011. These migration patterns underscore Australia's role as a refuge for persecuted groups, with Iraqi migrants, including those of Shia Muslim background, given the opportunity to maintain their cultural and religious identities while contributing to Australia's diverse multicultural and social fabric.

=== Afghanistan ===
While Afghani migration to Australia has a long history stretching back to the mid-19th century with the arrival of the cameleers, Afghan Shia migration—predominantly by the Hazara ethnic group—occurred in two major waves driven by ethnic and religious persecution, particularly under Taliban rule. The first significant wave spanned 1991–2010, with 41.1% of the Afghan population in Australia arriving during this period, following the rise of the Taliban and the 2001 US invasion of Afghanistan. Shia Hazaras, targeted for their ethnicity and religious beliefs, faced massacres and systematic exclusion, prompting many to seek refuge in Australia through humanitarian programs. The second wave, between 2011 and 2020, accounted for 51.8% of Afghan migrants, with a significant portion being Shia Hazaras escaping ongoing Taliban violence and economic hardship.
